Alessio Iovine (born 1 February 1991) is an Italian footballer who plays as a midfielder for Como in Serie B.

Career

Como
In July 2019, Iovine moved to Serie C club Como. He made his league debut for the club on 25 August 2019 in a 2-0 victory over former club Pergolettese.

References

External links

1991 births
Living people
U.S. Pergolettese 1932 players
A.C. Renate players
A.S. Giana Erminio players
Como 1907 players
Serie B players
Serie C players
Italian footballers
Association football midfielders
Sportspeople from Como
Footballers from Lombardy